Trent Lott International Airport  is a county-owned public-use airport located in Moss Point, Mississippi  north of the central business district of Pascagoula, a city in Jackson County, Mississippi, United States. The airport is named for Trent Lott, a former United States Senator from Mississippi.

Although many U.S. airports use the same three-letter location identifier for the FAA and IATA, Trent Lott International Airport is assigned PQL by the FAA and PGL by the IATA. PGL was formerly assigned to Jackson County Airport in Pascagoula which closed sometime between 1982 and 1989.

DayJet provided an on-demand jet air taxi service from this airport to Jacksonville, Lakeland, Tallahassee, Pensacola, Gainesville, Boca Raton, Opa-Locka/Miami Dade County, Naples, Sarasota/Bradenton, Savannah, Macon, and Montgomery. This service ended in September 2008.

Facilities and aircraft 

For the 12-month period ending June 2, 2016, the airport had 52,213 aircraft operations, an average of 143 per day: 86% general aviation, 10% air taxi and 4% military. At that time there were 32 aircraft based at this airport: 25 single-engine, 3 multi-engine, 2 jet and 2 helicopter.

References

External links 

 Trent Lott International Airport page at Jackson County website
 

Airports in Mississippi
Buildings and structures in Jackson County, Mississippi
Transportation in Jackson County, Mississippi